Ptilium crista-castrensis, the knights plume moss or ostrich-plume feathermoss, is a moss species within the family Pylaisiaceae, in the class Bryopsida, subclass Bryidae and order Hypnales.

Ecology
This species occurs on the floor of Canadian boreal forests as well as many forests of northern Europe; an example of this occurrence is within the black spruce/feathermoss climax forest, often having moderately dense canopy and featuring a forest floor of feathermosses including Hylocomium splendens, Pleurozium schreberi and Ptilium crista-castrensis.

References
 C. Michael Hogan. 2008. Black Spruce: Picea mariana, GlobalTwitcher.com, ed. Nicklas Stromberg 
 ITIS Report. 1999. Family: Hypnaceae

Line notes

Hypnaceae